Lüner Lake (German Lünersee) is a large lake near the town of Bludenz in Vorarlberg, Austria.

The lake's depth was raised by 72 metres by the construction of a hydroelectric dam in 1958. The dam supplies water to four local power plants, Lünersee, Rodund I, Rodund II and Walgau. The lake is linked to the village of Brand by a cable car system, the Lünerseebahn.

Gallery

External links

Luenerseebahn website 

Lakes of Vorarlberg
Mountain lakes
LLunersee